Plethochaetigera is a genus of parasitic flies in the family Tachinidae. There are at least three described species in Plethochaetigera.

Species
These three species belong to the genus Plethochaetigera:
 Plethochaetigera fenwicki Malloch, 1938
 Plethochaetigera isolata Malloch, 1938
 Plethochaetigera setiventris Malloch, 1938

References

Further reading

 
 
 
 

Tachinidae
Articles created by Qbugbot